Following is an alphabetical list of inductees into the Alaska Aviation Heritage Museum's Alaska Aviation Hall of Fame.

 Arthur Gordon "Art" Woodley Alaska Aviation Hall of Fame
 Bob and Marge Baker - Alaska Aviation Hall of Fame, 2021 Aviation Entrepreneur 
 Carl Benjamin "Ben" Eielson (1897–1929) Alaska Aviation Hall of Fame; National Aviation Hall of Fame
 Hans Roald Amundsen - Alaska Aviation Hall of Fame, 2019 Aviation Entrepreneur
 Jim Jansen - Alaska Aviation Hall of Fame, 2019 Lifetime Achievement
 Joseph E. "Joe" Crosson (1903–1949) Alaska Aviation Hall of Fame
 Leon "Babe" Alsworth - Alaska Aviation Hall of Fame, 2019 Explorer and Pathfinder
 Merle K. "Mudhole" Smith (1907–1981) Alaska Aviation Hall of Fame; OX-5 Aviation Pioneers Hall of Fame
 Noel Wien (1899–1977) Alaska Aviation Hall of Fame; OX-5 Aviation Pioneers Hall of Fame; Minnesota Aviation Hall of Fame
 Raymond Ingvard "Ray" Petersen (1912–2008) Alaska Aviation Hall of Fame
 Robert Campbell "Bob" Reeve (1902–1980) Alaska Aviation Hall of Fame; National Aviation Hall of Fame; International Aerospace Hall of Fame; Wisconsin Aviation Hall of Fame
 Robert E. "Bob" Ellis (1903–1994) Alaska Aviation Hall of Fame
 Ron Sheardown - Alaska Aviation Hall of Fame, 2021 Explorer and Pathfinder
 Ruth M. Jefford (1914–2007) Alaska Aviation Hall of Fame
 Russel Hyde "Russ" Merrill (1894–1929) Alaska Aviation Hall of Fame
 Ted Stevens - Alaska Aviation Hall of Fame, 2021 Lifetime Achievement

See also

 List of people from Alaska
 List of aviators

References

External links
 , the hall of fame's module at the Alaska Aviation Heritage Museum's website

Aviation history of the United States

Alaskan Hall of Fame pilots